Metiaburuz Assembly constituency is a Legislative Assembly constituency of South 24 Parganas district in the Indian state of West Bengal.

Overview
As per orders of the Delimitation Commission, No. 157 Metiaburuz Assembly constituency is composed of the following: Ward Nos. 136, 137, 138, 139, 140, and 141 of Kolkata Municipal Corporation and Ward Nos. 1 to 7, 9 and 10 of Maheshtala municipality.

Metiaburuz Assembly constituency is part of No. 21 Diamond Harbour (Lok Sabha constituency).

Members of Legislative Assembly

Election results

2016

2011

 

 

Abdul Khaleque Molla, contesting as an independent, was a rebel Congress candidate.

References

Notes

Citations

Assembly constituencies of West Bengal
Politics of South 24 Parganas district